The 1999–2000 NBA season was the Utah Jazz's 26th season in the National Basketball Association, and 21st season in Salt Lake City, Utah. During the off-season, the Jazz signed free agent Olden Polynice, then later on signed Armen Gilliam in January. Polynice became the team's starting center as Greg Ostertag played off the bench as a backup to Polynice. The Jazz were now the oldest team in the NBA still led by John Stockton and Karl Malone, who were both selected for the 2000 NBA All-Star Game, which was Stockton's final All-Star appearance. The Jazz got off to a solid 15–7 start, which included a 7-game winning streak, but then lost six straight games between January and February, holding a 29–18 record at the All-Star break. However, they would win nine consecutive games between February and March, and recapture the Midwest Division with a solid 55–27 record, qualifying for the playoffs for the 17th straight season.

Malone averaged 25.5 points and 9.5 rebounds per game, was named to the All-NBA Second Team, and finished in fourth place in Most Valuable Player voting, and also reached a milestone by scoring his 30,000th point during this season. In addition, Bryon Russell averaged 14.1 points, 5.2 rebounds and 1.6 steals per game, while Jeff Hornacek contributed 12.4 points per game, Stockton provided the team with 12.1 points, 8.6 assists and 1.7 steals per game, and sixth man Howard Eisley contributed 8.6 points and 4.2 assists per game off the bench. On the defensive side, Polynice averaged 5.3 points and 5.5 rebounds per game, and Ostertag provided with 6.0 rebounds, and led the team with 2.1 blocks per game off the bench. Hornacek also won both the Three-Point Shootout, and the 2-Ball competition during the All-Star Weekend in Oakland.

In the playoffs, the Jazz defeated the Seattle SuperSonics three games to two in the Western Conference First Round, but would lose in five games to the Pacific champion Portland Trail Blazers in the Western Conference Semi-finals for the second consecutive year. 

Following the season, Hornacek retired ending his fourteen-year career in the NBA. Meanwhile, Gilliam also retired while Eisley was traded to the Dallas Mavericks, and Adam Keefe was dealt to the Golden State Warriors.

Draft picks

Roster

Regular season

Season standings

Record vs. opponents

Playoffs

|- align="center" bgcolor="#ccffcc"
| 1
| April 22
| Seattle
| W 104–93
| Karl Malone (50)
| Karl Malone (12)
| Jeff Hornacek (11)
| Delta Center19,911
| 1–0
|- align="center" bgcolor="#ccffcc"
| 2
| April 24
| Seattle
| W 101–87
| Karl Malone (23)
| Greg Ostertag (12)
| John Stockton (11)
| Delta Center19,911
| 2–0
|- align="center" bgcolor="#ffcccc"
| 3
| April 29
| @ Seattle
| L 78–89
| Karl Malone (30)
| three players tied (6)
| John Stockton (13)
| KeyArena16,713
| 2–1
|- align="center" bgcolor="#ffcccc"
| 4
| May 3
| @ Seattle
| L 93–104
| Bryon Russell (26)
| Karl Malone (14)
| John Stockton (12)
| KeyArena16,631
| 2–2
|- align="center" bgcolor="#ccffcc"
| 5
| May 5
| Seattle
| W 96–93
| Karl Malone (27)
| Karl Malone (8)
| John Stockton (15)
| Delta Center19,911
| 3–2
|-

|- align="center" bgcolor="#ffcccc"
| 1
| May 7
| @ Portland
| L 75–94
| Karl Malone (22)
| Malone, Polynice (8)
| John Stockton (6)
| Rose Garden20,351
| 0–1
|- align="center" bgcolor="#ffcccc"
| 2
| May 9
| @ Portland
| L 85–103
| Karl Malone (15)
| Olden Polynice (6)
| John Stockton (6)
| Rose Garden20,463
| 0–2
|- align="center" bgcolor="#ffcccc"
| 3
| May 11
| Portland
| L 84–103
| Karl Malone (28)
| Karl Malone (11)
| John Stockton (12)
| Delta Center19,911
| 0–3
|- align="center" bgcolor="#ccffcc"
| 4
| May 14
| Portland
| W 88–85
| Karl Malone (27)
| Olden Polynice (11)
| John Stockton (9)
| Delta Center19,627
| 1–3
|- align="center" bgcolor="#ffcccc"
| 5
| May 16
| @ Portland
| L 79–81
| Karl Malone (27)
| Karl Malone (11)
| John Stockton (9)
| Rose Garden20,043
| 1–4
|-

Player statistics

NOTE: Please write players statistics in alphabetical order by last name.

Season

Playoffs

Awards and records
 Karl Malone, All-NBA Second Team

Transactions

References

Utah Jazz seasons
Utah
Utah
Utah